Gail Hirschorn Evans (born 17 December 1941) is an American author, lecturer, and business executive. She is known for being the highest ranking female executive at  Cable News Network and for her two books, Play Like a Man, Win Like a Woman and She Wins, You Win.

Early life
Evans was born on 17 December 1941 and received a bachelor's degree from Bennington College. Her first job was at the office of The Honorable William Fitts Ryan (D-NY). She later served as legislative and executive assistant to Sen. Harrison Arlington Williams of New Jersey.  During the Johnson administration she served in Office of the Special Counsel to the President where she worked on the creation of the Presidents Committee on Equal Employment Opportunity and the 1965 Civil Rights Act. She later moved to the Import Export Bank when Hobart Taylor became president of the Bank. Lyndon B. Johnson Administration.

CNN
Evans began working at CNN at its inception in 1980. By the time she retired in 2001, she was Executive Vice President of the CNN Newsgroup. During that time she was responsible for program and talent development at all of CNN’s domestic networks overseeing national and international talk shows and the Network Guest Bookings Department, which scheduled about 25,000 guests each year. She is responsible for developing many of CNN’s talk shows including Crossfire, Burden of Proof, Talkback Live, Capital Gang and Crier & Co.

She is credited with helping to discover and guide the careers of Katie Couric and Greta Van Susteren.

Post-CNN Career
In 1999, Evans announced she would write a book about the lessons she had learned climbing to the top of the corporate ladder. She met with several publishers and it was estimated that she could get a $500,000 advance to write the book. Play Like a Man, Win Like a Woman came out in September, 2001 and was an instant hit, reaching the top 10 on the New York Times bestseller list and being translated into 21 different languages. Following an appearance on Larry King Live, Evans' book spiked as high as #3 on Amazon.com's bestseller list.

In 2003, Evans wrote a follow-up, She Wins, You Win. Though not as much of a commercial success, the second book got strong reviews. Publishers Weekly described it as, "an aggressive but motivating handbook for women who are serious about career success."

Evans is also a corporate speaker and consultant on women in the workplace, giving lectures to AT&T, Johnson & Johnson, GE, Microsoft, JP Morgan , Morgan Stanley, Wells Fargo, KPMG, Cisco, IBM, Thompson Reuters, Deloitte, Intel, and Walmart.

She currently teaches organizational behavior as it relates to gender, race, and ethnicity at Georgia Tech.

Personal life
Evans was married to former CBS correspondent Bob Evans for more than 30 years before getting divorced in March 2000. They have 3 children and 7 grandchildren.

References

American businesspeople
Skidmore College alumni
Living people
American writers
Bennington College alumni
People from Atlanta
1941 births